Loweporus is a genus of fungi in the family Polyporaceae. The genus was circumscribed by Argentinian mycologist Jorge Eduardo Wright in 1976. The genus is named in honour of American mycologist and polypore specialist Josiah Lincoln Lowe.

Species
Loweporus castaneus Corner (1989)
Loweporus corticicola Corner (1989)
Loweporus lividus  (Kalchbr.) J.E.Wright (1976)
Loweporus mollis Corner (1989)
Loweporus ochraceicinctus  Corner (1989)
Loweporus pileoliferus Corner (1989)
Loweporus rufescens Corner (1989)
Loweporus tephroporus (Mont.) Ryvarden (1980)

References

Polyporaceae
Polyporales genera
Fungi described in 1976